Rajlakshmi Srikanta is a Bangladeshi Bengali language film released in 1987. The film is directed by Bulbul Ahmed and based on a novel by Saratchandra Chattopadhyay. The screenplay and dialogues of the film were written by Bulbul Ahmed , Mumtazuddin Ahmed and Zahirul Haque . Shabana and Bulbul Ahmed acted in the title role of the film. Praveer Mitra , Nutan , Razzak and many othersacted in other rolesThe film won the National Film Award and Bacchus Award in multiple categories including Best Film in 1987 .

Cast 
 Shabana
 Bulbul Ahmed
 Rasel
 Prabir Mitra
 Nutan

Soundtrack

Awards 
12th Bangladesh National Film Awards
Best Film - Bulbul Ahmed
Best Supporting Actor - Abul Khair
Best Female Playback Singer - Sabina Yasmin
Best Child Artist - Master Rasel and Suborna Shirin

Bachsas Awards
Best Film - Bulbul Ahmed
Best Director - Bulbul Ahmed
Best Actor - Bulbul Ahmed
Best Actress - Shabana
Best Supporting Actor - Prabir Mitra
Best Supporting Actress - Nutan
Best Screenplay - Bulbul Ahmed
Best Female Playback Singer - Sabina Yasmin
Best Lyricist - Gazi Mazharul Anwar
Best Cinematographer - M. A. Mobin
Best Editing - Atikur Rahman Mollik

References

External links
 

1987 films
Bengali-language Bangladeshi films
Films scored by Alauddin Ali
1980s Bengali-language films
Best Film Bachsas Award winners
Best Film National Film Award (Bangladesh) winners